"Bathysphaera intacta", the "giant dragonfish" is species of fish that was described by William Beebe on 22 September 1932, being spotted by the biologist as he descended to a depth of 640 metres (2100 feet) of the coast of Bermuda
.

Background

The "bathysphere", as termed by Beebe, was a new invention, a rounded steel enclosure with space adequate for two people. On the side, there was a single window, fifteen centimetres across. Having no camera equipment on the 1930 to 1934 dives, Beebe described observations in detail to Else Bostelmann, an artist who proceeded to illustrate the descriptions.

The encounter
Beebe encountered two fish, which he had described as "six feet long". He said they resembled barracudas, with short heads and jaws that were constantly opened. The fish expressed bioluminescence, as stated by him: "strong lights, pale bluish, was strung down the body".

Bebe then expressed his justification for classifying them as dragonfish:

"Vertical fins well back were one of the characters which placed it among the sea-dragons, Melanostomiatids, and were clearly seen when the fish passed through the beam. There were two long tentacles, hanging down from the body, each tipped with a pair of separate, luminous bodies, the upper reddish, the lower one blue. These twitched and jerked along beneath the fish, one undoubtedly arising from the chin, and the other far back near the tail. I could see neither the stem of the tentacles nor any paired fins, although both were certainly present."

It was the first fish described by Beebe, which he gave the name Bathysphaera intacta, with “bathysphaera” referring to his submersible and "intacta", in his context, meaning "untouchable".

Status of existence

Of the six new fish described by Beebe, none of them were confirmed to exist. His colleague Otis Barton, who descended with him in the submersible, also claimed to have seen them. 
.

At the time, the largest dragonfish commonly attained lengths of 40 centimetres, a fact that Beebe acknowledges. He refers to the giant dragonfish as being "related to the scaleless black dragonfish ( Melanostomias bartonbeani)".

Currently, the largest dragon fish species is the obese dragonfish. Even then, its attained length is a maximum of 55 centimetres which is less than a third of the length of the fish that Beebe saw.

See also 

 Bathysidus
 Bathyembryx

References

Controversial taxa
Fish described in 1932